Mark Montano is an American interior designer, artist, writer, and TV personality.

Television 
Mark Montano is perhaps best known for three series on the Style Network and The Learning Channel: 10 Years Younger, which he hosted, While You Were Out, on which he frequently appears as a designer, and My Celebrity Home on which he is both host and designer. Montano can currently be seen on WE TV's new show, "She's Moving In". Montano has a flamboyant design sense that homeowners on While You Were Out are sometimes less than enthused about at first, but he usually wins them over with his boisterous personality. In 2021 he co-starred with Chrissy Metz (This Is Us) and Leann Rimes to host Meet Your Makers Showdown for Discovery +. 

On My Celebrity Home, Mark tours a celebrity's home and gives their style to a fan. Mark filmed MY HOME 2.0 which aired on FOX and FIOS channels nationwide in April 2010.
In 2015 Mark produced and filmed a 12 episode, half-hour series called Make Your Mark.  Make Your Mark is a DIY show based on his blog and YouTube channel and currently airs on most public television stations.

The Big-Ass Book of Crafts (2008) and other works 
Mark Montano is the author of several successful books. "The Big-Ass Book of Crafts", published through SimonSpotlight, subsidiary of Simon & Schuster, owned by parent company CBS, was released on February 18, 2008, and is now the number 1 selling craft book in America. The Big-Ass Book of Crafts is currently in its 7th printing as of January 2009. The Big-Ass Book of Home Decor was on shelves starting April 2010. In January 2011, Pulp Fiction: Perfect Paper Projects, was published and on October 11, The Big-Ass Book of Crafts 2 was officially on bookstore shelves everywhere. "The Big-Ass Book of bling" is on shelves starting November 1, 2012.

Various projects from Mark's books are available in Tutorial form on his Official Blog and on his YouTube channel.

Bibliography 
"The Big Ass Book of Bling" (2012) 
 "The Big Ass Book of Crafts 2" (2011) 
 Pulp Fiction: Perfect Paper Projects (2011) 
 The Big-Ass Book of Home Decor (2010) 
 The Big-Ass Book of Crafts (2008) 
 Super Suite: The Ultimate Bedroom Makeover Guide for Girls (2002) 
 Window Treatments and Slipcovers for Dummies (2005) 
 Dollar Store Decor: 100 Projects for Lush Living That Won't Break the Bank (2005)

References

External links 
 Mark Montano Official Site
 Mark Montano Official Blog
 Mark Montano Blogger
 Mark Montano Official Facebook 
 
 
 Mark Montano on Etsy.com
 Nest.com article
 Mark Montano Crescendoh blog

American columnists
American interior designers
American television hosts
American male non-fiction writers
Design writers
Living people
1965 births